Phalodi Air Force Station  of the Indian Air Force is located in Phalodi in Jodhpur, Rajasthan, India.

History
This Air Force Station of the Indian Air Force at Phalodi was commissioned in 2010 and is the sixth Air Force Station in Rajasthan. The base is located about 100 km from the international border with Pakistan. It lies between the Jaisalmer and Jodhpur airbases of the IAF. The base covers an area of 4000 acres and is equipped with sophisticated surveillance equipment and deep penetration aircraft.  Phalodi Air Force Station has a runway for the aircraft, aircraft maintenance area, administrative complex, living accommodation for officers as well as other ranks, and all other essential parameters and modern facilities required for an air base station. The base is under the South Western Air Command

Facilities
The airport is situated at an elevation of 554 feet (169 m) above mean sea level. It has one runway with concrete surfaces: 11/29 measuring 3,565 by 55 feet (1,087 x 17 m).

References

Indian Air Force bases
Airports in Rajasthan
2010 establishments in Rajasthan
Military installations established in 2010
Airports established in 2010